The Municipality of Sveti Jurij ob Ščavnici is a municipality in the traditional region of Styria in northeastern Slovenia. The seat of the municipality is the town of Sveti Jurij ob Ščavnici. Sveti Jurij ob Ščavnici became a municipality in 1994.

Settlements
In addition to the municipal seat of Sveti Jurij ob Ščavnici, the municipality also includes the following settlements:

 Biserjane
 Blaguš
 Bolehnečici
 Brezje
 Čakova
 Dragotinci
 Gabrc
 Galušak
 Grabonoš
 Grabšinci
 Jamna
 Kočki Vrh
 Kokolajnščak
 Kraljevci
 Kupetinci
 Kutinci
 Mali Moravščak
 Rožički Vrh
 Selišči
 Slaptinci
 Sovjak
 Stanetinci
 Stara Gora
 Terbegovci
 Ženik
 Žihlava

References

External links

Municipality of Sveti Jurij ob Ščavnici on Geopedia
Municipality of Sveti Jurij ob Ščavnici website

Sveti Jurij ob Scavnici
1994 establishments in Slovenia